Hospital Bridge, in Downieville, California, was built in 1908.  It brings Upper Main St. over the Downie River.  It was listed on the National Register of Historic Places in 2012.

It is a through Pratt truss bridge built or fabricated by the Western Bridge and Construction Company.  George F. Taylor is associated.

It may also be known as Downieville Bridge or Downie River Bridge.

The bridge was bypassed in 1986.  In 2017 it was for use by pedestrians only.

References

Bridges on the National Register of Historic Places in California
Pratt truss bridges in the United States
National Register of Historic Places in Sierra County, California
Bridges completed in 1908
Downieville, California